Vicky Pruim (born 24 February 1974) is a Belgian born Swedish darts player who plays internationally for Sweden, and in competitive darting events around the world. Vicky started her darts career in 1987, successfully defending her Belgium No1 ladies title for 13 years. Vicky moved to Sweden in 2002, where she gained Swedish nationality, and became part of the Swedish Darts Federation national team. She qualified for the BDO World Darts Championship in 2002, 2018, and 2020 BDO World Darts Championship.Vicky reached last 16 in 2022 WDF World Darts Championship. Vicky won the women’s singles Gold Medal for Sweden, at the 2017 WDF World Cup in Japan and achieved Bronze Medal for Sweden, at the 2019 WDF World Cup in Romania. Vicky moved to England in 2019, and now resides in Chester, England with her partner Lainey Webb.

Career

1990–2002
In 1990, Pruim reached the Final of the WDF Europe Cup. In 1999, she reached the Last 16 of the WDF World Cup and Quarter Final of the World Masters. In 2001, she won the Dutch Open. She reached the Semi Final of the 2002 BDO World Darts Championship, where she lost to Trina Gulliver 2–0.

2016–
In 2016 she won the Finnish Masters and Finnish Open. In 2017, she won the Finnish Masters for a second time. She qualified for the 2018 BDO World Darts Championship as one of the playoff qualifiers. In the tournament, she played Trina Gulliver in the Last 16 losing 2–1.

World Championship results

BDO/WDF
 2002: Semi-finals (lost to Trina Gulliver 1–2) (sets)
 2018: First round (lost to Trina Gulliver 1–2)
 2020: First round (lost to Corrine Hammond 0–2)
 2022: Second round (lost to Lorraine Winstanley 0–2)

External links
 Profile and stats on Darts Database

1974 births
Living people
Belgian darts players
Swedish darts players
British Darts Organisation players
Professional Darts Corporation women's players